Genesis: The Creation and the Flood (also called The Bible: Genesis in Australia) is a 1994 television film shot in Morocco, directed by an Italian film director, renowned Ermanno Olmi. It is based on the Book of Genesis, first book of the Hebrew Bible, where creation of the world and Great Flood are described.

This film utilizes a cast of native Bedouins. Text of Genesis is read by a narrator, who at times appears as an elderly desert nomad telling the story to his extended Bedouin family.

Modern clips of warfare and destruction are used to illustrate some Old Testament pronouncements about the evils practiced by mankind. The script fairly accurately follows the first nine chapters of Genesis, with a few added portions, like excerpts from the Song of Songs, Leviticus 26, and Psalm 50.

Plot 
This story begins with the creation of this planet. It is told by an old desert shepherd whose grandson is very young and curious.

The old man also mentions Adam and Eve, their temptation and transgression by a snake which led to their permanent banishment from the Garden of Eden.

The story continues with the first crime committed by mankind: Cain murdering his brother Abel.

Genealogy of Cain and genealogy of Seth are also given. 
 
Mankindʻs corruption was great on Earth. God felt regret for making humans, but there was a man called Noah. He and his family obediently build an ark to guard themselves and animals from a flood that will wash away mankind's wickedness.

All these events are told through the clear and simple words of an old nomad shepherd.

Cast 
Omero Antonutti (voiced in English by Paul Scofield) – old narrator / Noah
Sabir Aziz – Adam
Haddou Zoubida – Eve
Annabi Abdelialil – Cain
B. Haddan Mohammed – Abel

Notes

External links 
 Genesis: The Creation and the Flood at Vimeo
 

Films based on the Book of Genesis
Italian drama films
1994 television films
1994 films
1994 drama films
Italian television films
Cultural depictions of Adam and Eve
Cultural depictions of Cain and Abel
Cultural depictions of Noah
Noah's Ark in film
Films directed by Ermanno Olmi
1990s Italian films